Protoheme IX farnesyltransferase, mitochondrial is an enzyme that in humans is encoded by the COX10 gene. Cytochrome c oxidase (COX), the terminal component of the mitochondrial respiratory chain, catalyzes the electron transfer from reduced cytochrome c to oxygen. This component is a heteromeric complex consisting of 3 catalytic subunits encoded by mitochondrial genes and multiple structural subunits encoded by nuclear genes. The mitochondrially-encoded subunits function in electron transfer, and the nuclear-encoded subunits may function in the regulation and assembly of the complex. This nuclear gene, COX10, encodes heme A: farnesyltransferase, which is not a structural subunit but required for the expression of functional COX and functions in the maturation of the heme A prosthetic group of COX. A gene mutation, which results in the substitution of a lysine for an asparagine (N204K), is identified to be responsible for cytochrome c oxidase deficiency. In addition, this gene is disrupted in patients with CMT1A (Charcot-Marie-Tooth type 1A) duplication and with HNPP (hereditary neuropathy with liability to pressure palsies) deletion.

Structure 
The COX10 gene is located on the p arm of chromosome 17 in position 12 and spans 139,277 base pairs. The gene produces a 48.9 kDa protein composed of 443 amino acids. This gene has an unusually long 3' untranslated region measuring 1426 base pairs, compared to a 1329 base pair open reading frame. The COX10 gene has 7 exons totaling 135 kilobases in length. This protein is predicted to contain 7-9 transmembrane domains localized in the mitochondrial inner membrane. There are hydrophilic loops between transmembrane domains II/III and VI/VII. This protein is considered a constituent of the mitochondrial inner membrane.

Function 
The protein encoded by COX10 is an assembly factor essential to COX synthesis, participating in the first step of the mitochondrial heme A biosynthetic pathway. It catalyzes the farnesylation of the vinyl group at position C2 of protoheme (heme B) and converts it to heme O.

Clinical Significance 
Mutations in the COX10 gene can result in numerous clinical phenotypes, from tubulopathy and leukodystrophy to Leigh syndrome to fatal infantile cardiomyopathy to a French Canadian form of Leigh Syndrome. A wide variety of symptoms encompassing the entire range of COX deficiency symptoms have been reported, including ataxia, hypotonia, ptosis, lactic acidosis, proximal tubulopathy, anemia, myopathy, hypertrophic cardiomyopathy, sensorineural hearing loss, and leukodystrophy.

In addition, this gene is disrupted in patients with CMT1A (Charcot-Marie-Tooth type 1A) duplication and with HNPP (hereditary neuropathy with liability to pressure palsies) deletion.

Interactions 
This protein interacts with FAM136A.

References

External links

Further reading